Franklin Gorge or just Franklin or Cranklin Gorge is a small sport climbing area near Spruce Knob–Seneca Rocks National Recreation Area located near Franklin, WV. This rock climbing spot was first discovered and developed by John Burcham and friends during the early-mid 90s.  The site contains mostly sport and top rope climbing as well as some traditional climbing, and is located on private land.  The rock is layered sandstone and some limestone which create horizontals, and the site has pockets and huecos for the majority of the holds. This site is the first place many Mid-Atlantic climbers cut their teeth on bolted rock climbing routes before going on to challenge the New River Gorge.

Guidebooks
Online topos, circulated since the 1990s

References

External links
 Detailed Routes
Flickr Photos
Youtube Videos
Mid Atlantic Climbers, a local non-profit organization that seeks to maintain access to climbing areas

Canyons and gorges of West Virginia
Climbing areas of the United States
Landforms of Pendleton County, West Virginia
Tourist attractions in Pendleton County, West Virginia